Grethcel Soltones (sometimes mistakenly named as Gretchel Soltones) (born September 9, 1995) is a Filipina volleyball player for the Petro Gazz Angels in the Premier Volleyball League.

Early life
Grethcel Soltones was born and raised in Catmon, Cebu.

Career
Soltones played for San Sebastian Lady Stags in the National Collegiate Athletic Association (NCAA) women's volleyball tournament and was named Most Valuable Player for during the NCAA Season 90, 91 and 92,. being also selected First Best Outside Spiker in the Season 92.

She also played for the PLDT Home Ultera Ultra Fast Hitters and the Bali Pure Purest Water Defenders in the Shakey's V-League, where she was crowned the conference MVP during the 13th Season Open Conference.

She was a one-time national team player, who represented the Philippines in the 2015 Asian U23 Women’s Volleyball Championship and the 2015 Southeast Asian Games.

On February 25, 2017, San Sebastian Lady Stags coach Roger Gorayeb broke the news that Soltones and fellow Lady Stag player Villegas agreed to play for Foton Tornadoes.

On 2018, Soltones suited-up again for the Philippine women's volleyball team that competed in the 2018 Asian Women's Volleyball Cup held at Nakhon Ratchasima, Thailand.

Filmography

Television

Awards

Individuals
 2014 NCAA Season 90 "Most Valuable Player"
 2015 NCAA Season 91 "Best Scorer"
 2015 NCAA Season 91 "Most Valuable Player"
 2016 NCAA Season 92 "Most Valuable Player"
 2016 NCAA Season 92 "1st Best Outside Spiker"
 2016 Shakey's V-League Open Conference "Conference Most Valuable Player"
 2017 Premier Volleyball League Reinforced Conference "2nd Best Outside Spiker"
 2017 Premier Volleyball League Open Conference "Finals Most Valuable Player"
 2017 Premier Volleyball League Open Conference "2nd Best Outside Spiker"
 2014 NCAA Season 91 "Beach Volleyball Champion & MVP"
 2015 NCAA Season 91 "Beach Volleyball Champion & MVP”
 2016 NCAA Season 91 "Beach Volleyball Champion & MVP”
 2017 NCAA Season 91 "Beach Volleyball Champion & MVP"

References

1995 births
Living people
Sportspeople from Cebu
San Sebastian College – Recoletos alumni
Philippines women's international volleyball players
Filipino women's volleyball players
Outside hitters
National Collegiate Athletic Association (Philippines) players
Filipino women's beach volleyball players